is located in the Hidaka Mountains, Hokkaidō, Japan.

References
 Geographical Survey Institute

Tengu (Samani)